Jorge Jurado Garcia (born 22.09.1995) is Spanish actor, who is well known for his portrayals in television series Los Serrano and 2007 film Goal II: Living the Dream.

Career
Jurado began his career in television in 2002 with a small participation in the television series Hospital Central.

In 2007, he portrayed Enrique in film Goal II: Living the Dream, alongside famous football players of such as David Beckham, Iker Casillas, Cesc Fàbregas, Sergio Ramos, and Roberto Carlos.

From 2010 to 2011, he made a small participation in the youth television series Los protegidos.

Filmography

Television

Movies

External links
 

Living people
Male actors from Madrid
Spanish male film actors
Spanish male television actors
Spanish male child actors
1995 births